The Canadian is a transcontinental passenger train operated by Via Rail with service between Union Station in Toronto, Ontario and Pacific Central Station in Vancouver, British Columbia, Canada.

Before 1955, the Canadian was a Canadian Pacific (CP) train between Toronto and Chicago. On April 24, 1955, CP renamed its best transcontinental train between Montreal/Toronto and Vancouver the Canadian, with new lightweight stainless-steel equipment. Via Rail Canada took over in 1978, and, on January 15, 1990, designated the Canadian as its sole transcontinental service, between Toronto and Vancouver-only. (Montreal-Sudbury-Vancouver through service, originally the main section of the train, was discontinued on this date). The new service replaced the former "Super Continental" CN flagship passenger service, and continues to run as of 2022 primarily over Canadian National tracks.

History 
In the years following World War II, passenger trains on the CP consisted of a mixture of prewar heavyweight and pre- and post-war lightweight cars, even on its flagship transcontinental The Dominion and its eastern extension, The Atlantic Limited.  While these cars were serviceable, American trains of the early 1950s, such as the California Zephyr, had already adopted streamlined all-stainless steel consists featuring domed observation cars.  Following an evaluation in 1949 of the dome cars featured on the General Motors / Pullman Standard demonstrator Train of Tomorrow, CP management, including then-Vice President Norris R. Crump, resolved to upgrade its rolling stock.

In 1953, CP placed an order for 155 stainless steel cars with the Budd Company of Red Lion, Pennsylvania (a Philadelphia suburb) that included 18 rear-end dome cars (Park series), 18 Skyline mid-train dome cars, 30 coaches, 18 dining cars and 71 sleeping cars (Manor and Château series). A subsequent order for 18 baggage-crew dormitory cars brought the final to total to 173 cars: sufficient for establishing an entirely-new transcontinental service and partially re-equipping The Dominion.  The interior design of these new cars was contracted to the Philadelphia architectural firm Harbeson, Hough, Livingston & Larson (a company known for its industrial designs on other prominent passenger trains such as the Pioneer Zephyr), and the resulting furnishings and pastel-shaded colour schemes were widely acclaimed.

After deciding to name the Park series dome cars after famous Canadian parks, leading Canadian artists, including members of the Group of Seven, were commissioned to paint suitable murals for these cars.  When the decision was made to add budget sleeping cars, the Budd order was supplemented by 22 existing heavyweight sleepers that CP refurbished in its own Angus Shops, each fitted-out with Budd-style stainless steel cladding.  To complement the new rolling stock, CP ordered General Motors Diesel FP9 locomotives to supplement an existing fleet of FP7s.  Although these F-units remained the preferred power for the train, it would occasionally pulled by a variety of motive power, including Montreal Locomotive Works FPA-2s.

Service under CP
CP christened its new flagship train The Canadian and service began on April 24, 1955. Running time between Montreal and Vancouver was reduced from about 85 to 71 hours, so that passengers spent only three, rather than four, nights en route. Although CP competitor Canadian National Railways began its own new transcontinental service, the Super Continental, on the same day, CP was able to boast honestly that The Canadian was "The first and only all-stainless steel 'dome' stream-liner in Canada" — it was not until 1964 that the CN acquired dome cars from the Milwaukee Road.

The train operated with Montreal and Toronto sections, which ran combined west of Sudbury, Ontario. The Montreal section (also serving Ottawa) was known as train 1 westbound and train 2 eastbound, while the Toronto section was known as train 11 westbound and train 12 eastbound.  Matching its streamlined appearance, The Canadians 71-hour westbound schedule was 16 hours faster than that of The Dominion.

Although initially successful, passenger train ridership began to decline in Canada during the 1960s.  Facing competition from new jet aircraft and increased automobile usage following construction of the Trans-Canada Highway, the CP cancelled The Dominion in 1966, and petitioned the government to discontinue The Canadian in 1970.  Although this petition was denied, CP during the 1970s attempted to remove itself from the passenger service market. The Canadian was operated at reduced levels, with the government subsidizing 80 percent of its losses.

Service under Via Rail
Via Rail, a federal crown corporation, formally assumed responsibility for CP's passenger services on October 29, 1978, although the Via identity was not assumed by the trains themselves until the following summer. Following the takeover by Via, the Canadian became the company's premier transcontinental train, and initially operated over its old CP route.  It was supplemented by the former CN Super Continental, which operated over the parallel, but more northerly, CN route. The Canadian continued to be operated in two sections east of Sudbury and provided daily service west to Vancouver and east to Toronto and Montreal.

The Super Continental was discontinued in 1981 due to sharp budget cuts. Since then, the Canadian has Via Rail's only true transcontinental train. While the Super Continental was brought back in 1985 amid popular demand, it only ran as far east as Winnipeg.

In the aftermath of another round of deep budget cuts made to Via Rail on January 15, 1990, Via again discontinued the Super Continental, this time permanently. The Canadian was moved from CP trackage to the CN route plied by the Super Continental for its first quarter-century, dropping the Montreal section. The new longer route bypassed Thunder Bay, Regina and Calgary in favour of Saskatoon and Edmonton. This maintained transcontinental service and allowed Via to operate its government-mandated service to small communities along the line. At the same time, the absence of transportation alternatives along the CP route allowed entrepreneur Peter Armstrong to develop the Rocky Mountaineer excursion service.  Moreover, while pre-1990 schedules had daily service on both the CP and CN routes, service following the 1990 cuts was a mere three days per week, reduced further to two times a week in the off-season.

In 2007, the schedule was lengthened so that the train now takes four nights, rather than three, to travel between Toronto and Vancouver.  The four-night schedule is almost identical (in terms of travel time) with that of the 1940s, despite substantial technological change since then.

In 2013, the train was honoured by being featured on the back of the new polymer Canadian ten-dollar note.

, Via Rail continues to operate the Canadian using the rebuilt ex-CP Budd passenger equipment.

Due to CN's shortage of capacity on the cross-country line, 12-hour delays had become almost standard. On-time performance had fallen from 84% in 2009 to just 8% in 2017. Continuing delays reached nearly 2 days in length by mid-May, 2018. To address this issue, the schedule was lengthened again, effective July 26, 2018, to four days and four nights in each direction due to continuing schedule-reliability problems on the host railway: CN. This change has almost entirely resolved the issue.

The Canadian currently takes 94 hours 15 minutes westbound vs. 95 hours 29 minutes eastbound. This is 13h50m vs. 12h19m slower than the SSContinental's 80h25m vs. 83h10m and 13h5m vs. 12h24m slower than the Dominion's 81h10m vs. 83h5m schedules from 1952. The difference is entirely due to CN freight traffic being prioritized over passenger traffic along the route.

Current operations
When operating on the normal schedule, the Canadian operates twice per week, departing Toronto on Wednesdays and Sundays and Vancouver on Mondays and Fridays. The total journey takes about four days. An additional train operates once-weekly between Vancouver, Edmonton and Toronto in the summer months.

The great majority of stations operate as flag stops; passengers boarding or detraining at these stops must give advance notice.
On March 21, 2020, the Canadian and most other Via Rail services were suspended due to the pandemic. This suspension continued until December 11, to accommodate inspection and repair work as part of its Heritage Modernization Program. Beginning December 11, the Canadian was reinstated between Winnipeg and Vancouver only and ran once a week. Service to Toronto resumed on May 17, 2021, still operating once a week.

Service disruptions
In January 2020, service on the Canadian (along with nearly all of Via's other services) was suspended due to the 2020 Canadian pipeline and railway protests and blockades at several points along CN and Metrolinx lines. Partial service was restored in early March.

However, less than a month after the blockades were lifted, the COVID-19 pandemic and the closing of the Canada-US border temporarily impacted nearly all Via Rail services. While reduced service continued on the Corridor, all overnight trains except the Winnipeg-Churchill run were initially cancelled. Around 1000 employees across the system were temporarily laid off. Service was gradually restored in stages, with the Toronto-Winnipeg portion of the route being restored first. Service along the full Toronto-Vancouver route was finally restored in December 2020, with a single train running once a week in each direction.

In response to these two major disruptions, Via amended its cancellation policies to allow changes without penalty and full refunds.

In November 2021, service west of Winnipeg was impacted by the November 2021 Pacific Northwest floods. The November 13 westbound train out of Toronto, which was already underway when the floods hit, was halted at Winnipeg. Passengers with final destinations west of Winnipeg were bussed or flown to their final destinations. Service was not restored until December 12. Subsequent trains were significantly delayed between Edmonton and Vancouver by the supply chain backlog of previously stalled freight trains.

Classes of service
The Canadian offers three main classes of service: Economy, Sleeper Plus, and, since 2014, Prestige. It additionally includes one or more dining cars, at least one Skyline (dome) car per class, a Panorama car (west of Edmonton), and a Park car.

Prior to boarding
Sleeper Plus and Prestige passengers have access to the Via Rail business lounge, if available at that station. Prestige passengers are offered exclusive access to a dedicated business lounge area.

Sleeper Plus and Prestige passengers are pre-boarded.

No smoking is permitted in any Via station or on board the Canadian, including e-cigarettes and marijuana. The Canadian will make extended stops at some stations, which allow passengers to step outside the train and smoke if they so desire.

On board

Seating and rooms
Economy class cars are kept separate from sleeper cars. One concierge is assigned to every sleeper car, or sometimes to two sleeper cars. The Prestige rooms are at the very back of the train.

Economy offers reclining seats. Sleeper Plus has a choice of upper/lower berths, a roomette for one, or a cabin for two: each of which features chairs or facing sofa seats during the day and beds at night. Some berths can accommodate two persons. It is also possible to join two adjoining cabins for two to create a space for four people during the day. The second bed in a cabin for two is a pull-down bunk. Prestige offers a significantly larger cabin, with a modular leather sofa during the day which converts to a double bed at night. The Prestige cabin also has a much larger window.

Economy and Sleeper Plus have one washroom per car. Sleeper Plus roomettes and cabins for two include private washroom facilities, and additionally have access to a shared shower in each car. Prestige has both private washroom facilities and private showers.

Meals and entertainment
Sleeper Plus and Prestige include three-course meals in a dining car, including non-alcoholic drinks during meals and coffee/tea/snacks at all hours. Prestige additionally includes unlimited drinks, including alcoholic drinks, with a dedicated concierge who will bring requested drinks to the room. Economy gives access to a cafe car with light meals available for purchase. A Sleeper class which included accommodation but no meals was discontinued in 2015.

Meals include breakfast, lunch, and dinner. Breakfast is open seating, with an additional continental breakfast available in the Skyline car. Lunch and dinner are served in two or three seatings, usually chosen the previous evening.

All classes have access to their own Skyline car. Sleeper Plus and Prestige passengers also have access to the Panorama car. Prestige passengers have semi-exclusive access to the Park car, a licensed lounge at the back of the train.

Talks and activities are scheduled during the summer months. If a singer or musical group is travelling with the train, separate performances will be available to each class of service.

Prestige uniquely has an in-cabin flatscreen television, with a selection of TV channels and movies.

Changes during COVID-19
As of October 30, all Via Rail passengers are required by Canadian law to bring proof of vaccination.

The Prestige class was unavailable until February 14, 2022.

Masks are mandatory at all times in public areas on the train. They may be removed in cabins or nighttime berths, in the shower, or while eating or drinking.

During the initial restart, lunch was served in the cabin or berth seating area. This practice ended with the introduction of the Canadian law requiring proof of vaccination for all intercity public transportation. Shower time slots must be reserved with the car concierge, who disinfects the shower after each use.

All activities have been cancelled. The Panorama car has been discontinued for the duration. Dome cars are open, but with limited seating.

Route

Vancouver-Kamloops

Vancouver-Gifford 
The Canadian eastbound journey begins at Vancouver's Pacific Central Station. It uses the BNSF tracks through suburban communities including Burnaby, to New Westminster. After the train crosses the New Westminster Bridge, the Canadian leaves BNSF for CN tracks east.  From New Westminster to Gifford, British Columbia, the route passes railroad yards and industry.

Fraser and Thompson River Canyons 
At Gifford, the train diverts from the CN mainline and crosses the Fraser River to Mission. CN and CP utilize directional running through the Fraser and Thompson River canyons; eastbound trains use the CP lines and westbounds the CN tracks. Thus, for the section through the two canyons, the Canadian runs on its original CP route. From Mission to Cisco, the CP runs west (north) of the river; afterwards, it runs east (south). Near Basque, the eastbound Canadian transfers onto the CN main.

Westbound, the Canadian stays on the CN tracks all the way into Vancouver. The CN route passes through Painted Canyon, and features CN's  steel-arched bridge over the Fraser River and the CP mainline at Cisco. After Cisco, the CN mainline stays on the east/south side of the Fraser River all the way to the New Westminster Bridge, where the two routes merge.

On their regular schedules, both east and westbound Canadians travel through the Fraser and Thompson river canyons at night.

Basque-Kamloops 
Traveling eastbound from Basque, the CN line crosses back across the Thompson River.  Aside from a few brief deviations across the river, the line stays on the north/west side into just outside Kamloops.  Arriving in Kamloops, the train halts at CN's North Kamloops Station.

Kamloops–Jasper 

North Thompson River Canyon

For six hours after departing Kamloops, the tracks run north, following the North Thompson River for much of the way and crossing it four times up the valley. Several flag stops are located here — for example, Clearwater and Blue River. The Monashee Mountains lie to the east for much of the way to Valemount.

On the downslope side of the train lies the North Thompson River; in the distance are often-snow-covered mountains. The icefields of the Albreda Glacier should be visible for several miles. At Little Hells Gate (Port d'Enfer), the track lies above rapids similar to Hells Gate farther south on the Fraser. Pyramid Falls cascades  down the side of Mount Cheadle. The train slows down enough for passengers to get close-up looks and get a photo op.

South of Valemount, the train passes a memorial to the Canoe River crash.  The train then crosses the river over a  bridge before arriving at Valemount station.

Valemount–Redpass 
North of Valemount, eastbound and westbound trains routes again diverge.  Eastbound trains use CN's Albreda Subdivision, which continues to climb until Milepost 65.6, a curve near Jackman.  The line then runs eastward at constant elevation through Mount Robson Provincial Park, with views of Mount Robson.  The line passes through a  tunnel and then descends to Redpass Junction, where it joins with CN's Robson Subdivision. The latter is used by westbound trains; it is lower in elevation and has more favourable grades than the Albreda Subdivision.

Redpass-Yellowhead Pass 

Redpass Junction is near the western shore of Moose Lake. The train follows along the north shore of the lake for several miles, and there are a couple of splashing waterfalls cascading down from the mountains into the lake.  The south shore of the lake is the Selwyn Range, which the train has essentially detoured around.  The Yellowhead Highway (Highway 16) parallels the CN tracks to the north.

After Moose Lake, the train travels through a narrow valley nestled between the mountains, crosses the Moose and Fraser rivers and continues following the Fraser. Soon the train comes to the next major scenic highlight of the trip: Yellowhead Lake. Yellowhead Mountain continues to hover overhead to the north while Mounts Rockingham and Fitzwilliam can be seen to the south across the lake.

Yellowhead Pass marks the boundaries between British Columbia and Alberta, the Pacific and Mountain time zones, the Pacific and Arctic watersheds, and Mount Robson Provincial Park and Jasper National Park. Once again the train hugs mountainsides among the Victoria Cross Range (to the north) above the Miette River and runs through tunnels and past protective slide detector fences. Whistler's Peak is in view as the train descends, rounds a curve and pulls into the Jasper train station.

At Jasper

The Canadian, in both directions, is scheduled to be at Jasper station for an hour and a half for servicing.  Mount Edith Cavell is visible toward the south. Pyramid Mountain and the Victoria Cross Ranges are to the northwest. The Whistlers, to the southwest, can be summited via the Jasper Skytram.

Passengers are encouraged to get off the train and wander around downtown Jasper.  In addition to shops and restaurants, downtown Jasper contains Jasper Park Information Centre.  The centre provides maps and other information about the park and surrounding UNESCO World Heritage site through which the train travels.

The station itself has a few attractions: the Jasper Raven Totem Pole and a vintage CN 4-8-2 steam locomotive are on display, and inside the station is a café barista that also sells railroad memorabilia and other gifts. The station building was constructed by the CN in 1926 and was declared a heritage railway station by the federal government in 1992.

Jasper to Edmonton

The town of Jasper sits inside of a big "U," as it relates to the railroad. The railroad comes in from the northwest and rounds a curve into the station. At the station, the train is actually facing northeast. Upon leaving the station, the train continues in a more northeasterly direction rather than due east. Also the train has descended into Jasper from Yellowhead Pass and now climbs a grade shortly after leaving the Jasper railyards. The train runs along the mountainsides overlooking the Athabasca Valley and River and surrounding mountains. There is usually a flock of bighorn sheep grazing on the bluffs above the train to the north. During the winter, they can often be seen licking salt off the parallel Yellowhead Highway.  Other Canadian wildlife that may be seen from the train include bear, deer, elk, mountain goat, and various species of Canadian birds.

To the north/northwest, passengers will see the peaks of the Victoria Cross Range—so named because six of the peaks are named after Canadian recipients of the Victoria Cross.  Mount McKean and Mount Zengel are two such mountains that can be seen from the train.  Looking southward (across the river), there is the Colin Range. Hawk Mountain, Roche Bonhomme, and Morro Peak are among the peaks in this range that can be seen. English is the top of the grade, after which the train descends into the Athabasca Valley, passing Henry House.  The Yellowhead Highway (Highway 16) continues to parallel the route.

The train then crosses the Snaring River.

Snaring and Chetamon Mountains (the latter ) and the De Smet Range including the Roche de Smet can be all seen from the train to the north. The Snaring River Campground is near the confluence of the Snaring and Athabaska Rivers. Looking to the south, passengers can see the Jacques Range including such peaks as Roche Jacques and Cinquefoil Mountain.

Jasper Lake 
The train reaches the north shore of Jasper Lake and rides along it for several miles. The Yellowhead Highway rides along the south shore of the lake. The lake is a shallow, wide section of the Athabasca River. This has been the site of many CN publicity photographs—including of the Super Continental —through the years, and it is still popular with photographers, railfans, the present-day Canadian, its advertisers and its passengers. The Jasper Lake Sand Dunes are on the northwest shore of Jasper Lake and can be seen from the train. They are the only sand dunes ecosystem in the Canadian Rockies. Parts of the mainline have been built on causeways away from the shore, which have created several mini lakes. This adds to the effect of being out on the water, creating additional views of the lake, its waters and the forests and mountains surrounding it. The lake is surrounded by mountain ranges, many of which can be seen the train from various places along the lake. They include:

From southeast to southwest:

Miette Range.  Most prominent peaks include Utopia Mountain and Roche Miette.
Jacques Range. Prominent peaks: Cinquefoil Mountain,  Roche Jacques, and Mount Merlin.
Colin Range: Peaks include Mount Colin and Roche Bonhomme

Northwest to northeast:
 Victoria Cross Ranges
 De Smet Range. Prominent peaks include: Roche de Smet, and Mount Greenock.
 Bosche Range: Mount Aeolus and Roche à Bosche

The train crosses Stoney River, glides through a  horseshoe tunnel underneath Disaster Point, and begins riding along the shores of Brûlé Lake.  Along the way, it passes Black Cat Mountain and Mount Solomon. The Yellowhead Highway is on the other side of the lake. Folding Mountain should be visible as the train crosses the Athabasca River. The river is now on the north side of the tracks.

Entrance 
Entrance is the official easternmost point of the Canadian Rockies (at least on the CN), but the Miette Range usually is still visible for many miles as the train heads out across the prairies. The surrounding landscapes are still heavily forested and the riverbanks a bit dramatic, but the land slowly opens up to ever broader valleys, plains, and farmlands. The train crosses a curved trestle over Sundance Creek just west of Edson; then crosses the McLeod River on a  bridge and Wolf Creek on a  bridge. The train rides along the shores of three lakes: to the north Chip Lake; to the south, Octopus Lake and Wabamun Lake. Westbound, passengers should be able to start seeing mountains (still way off in the distance) just after crossing the Sundance Creek trestle.

The train finally reaches West Junction wye, and backs into Edmonton Via Rail station.  (Westbound trains also back into the station.)  The train is scheduled to dwell at the station for an hour for a crew change and other servicing. The Panorama car travels only between Vancouver and Edmonton. Here, the car is taken off (eastbound) or put on (westbound). Edmonton station is a suburban development across the street from the former airport Blatchford Field; the skyline of downtown Edmonton is off in the distance.

Edmonton to Saskatoon 
The train (in both east and westbound) backs into the station upon arrival with the train facing north while standing at the station. The train stops in the rural communities of Viking and Wainwright, Alberta, before turning south to follow Alberta Highway 610. The train then crosses the Alberta–Saskatchewan border and stops in Unity, Saskatchewan, before passing over the Killsquaw Lakes en route to Biggar. Now paralleling Saskatchewan Highway 14, the train enters Saskatoon from the west, stopping at the modern Saskatoon station south of downtown on the site of the CN Chappell Yard via a short spur line.

Saskatoon to Winnipeg 
After re-joining the CN main line, the train follows Saskatchewan Highway 11 out of the urban core of Saskatoon before once again paralleling the Yellowhead Highway. Now heading southeast, it begins to follow Saskatchewan Highway 2 into Watrous, where the tracks branch off once more. Staying on the CN main line, the train heads east towards Melville, paralleling Highway 15, and heads southeast towards the Saskatchewan–Manitoba border. After entering Manitoba, the train stops in Rivers, and heads east to Portage la Prairie, now following the Trans-Canada Highway. It then continues east towards Winnipeg, where the tracks turn north, following the Assiniboine River, and enter the historic Winnipeg Union Station. Here, passengers can transfer to the Winnipeg–Churchill train. Northeast of Union Station, the train crosses over the Red River, and heads east through CN's Transcona Yards.

Winnipeg to Toronto 
With its journey through the prairies almost over, the train heads out of the yards and continues east, following Manitoba Provincial Trunk Hwy. 15, towards the rural community of Elma, then turning east-northeast towards Brereton Lake, Ophir and Winnitoba, and crosses the Manitoba-Ontario border after traversing Whiteshell Provincial Park.  Now in Ontario, the train travels through the rugged Canadian Shield, stopping at Rice Lake and Copelands Landing station en route to Malachi.  After Malachi, the train loops around and heads through Ottermere, Minaki, Redditt, Farlane, Canyon and Red Lake Road, where it loops around once more and stops at Richan and Millidge, and continues into the town of Sioux Lookout.  Afterwards it heads through Savant Lake, Flindt Landing, Allanwater Bridge, Collins, Armstrong, Mud River, Ferland, Auden, Nakina, Longlac, Caramat, and Hillsport en route to Hornepayne.  After Hornepayne, it stops at Oba, where passengers could connect with the Algoma Central Railway's Sault Ste. Marie-Hearst train until 2014.  Stops are made at Elsas, Foleyet, Gogama, Westree, Ruel, Felix, McKee's Camp, and Laforest before the train enters Capreol.  At Sudbury, the train stops at Sudbury Junction, where passengers can transfer via taxi to the Sudbury-White River service.  The many flag stops between Winnipeg and Sudbury are usually only accessible by rail transport, and between Winnipeg and Capreol passengers may reserve to be dropped off or picked up at any location.

Parry Sound 
The train then turns south towards Parry Sound, Ontario and Washago, Ontario.  From the junction of Wanup to Parry Sound, directional running with both CN and CP Railways is again put into place. This time however, eastbound (southbound) trains utilize the CN Bala Subdivision, whilst westbound (northbound) trains use the CP Parry Sound Subdivision.  Thus the latter follows its original CP route here, traversing the Parry Sound CPR Trestle. Through Parry Sound, all trains make use of both CN and CP stations depending on the direction of travels.  At Bala, both CN's Bala Subdivision and the adjacent CP line diverges for the final time.

Bala to Toronto 
Until the 1990s, the train travelled through and stopped at Barrie and Orillia via the Newmarket Subdivision, which intersected with the Bala Sub in Washago, but was rerouted along the Bala Subdivision after most of the Newmarket Sub trackage was abandoned between Washago and Barrie. The Bala Sub parallels the shore of Lake Simcoe as far as Port Bolster before heading southwest into York Region. South of Gormley, the route is shared with GO Transit's Richmond Hill line commuter services, although the latter does not share stations with the Canadian. The Canadian passes through Richmond Hill and western Markham into the city of Toronto proper, with a scenic route paralleling the Don River for the final 10 km.

Toronto Terminal 
Trains returning to Vancouver leave Union Station either from the east as it came in from (if turned around prior), or from the west. In the latter case, the train would then proceed north along the Newmarket Subdivision, shared by GO Transit's Barrie line. This subdivision was the route for the transcontinental train until the 1990s as far north as Washago; however, the train only continues as far as Snyder Diamond in Vaughan today. At this point, the train backs up for about five minutes in order to connect with the York Subdivision. After that, the train heads eastbound towards Thornhill in western Markham to meet up with the Bala Subdivision at Doncaster Diamond and from there continue Northwest leaving the Greater Toronto Area towards Washago and eventually Vancouver.

Ridership, subsidies, and fares
In 2014, the train served 93,810 passengers receiving a government subsidy of $591 per entrained passenger or $0.50 per passenger mile.   Because the Canadian is used primarily by tourists, these subsidies have been the source of significant criticism.

Economy fares on the Canadian between major cities are comparable to scheduled air travel, in some cases are significantly less. Escape fares and Canrailpass purchases can sometimes compare favourably to the cheapest equivalent air fares, Special promotions can drop that price even further, especially outside the busy summer season. Sleeper Plus service between major cities is usually more expensive than air travel, even after deals, but includes meals, accommodation, and some entertainment options.

Seniors, military members, former railway employees, serving Members of Parliament/Senate, and children are often eligible for additional discounts.  Via also offers discounted/complimentary transportation for artists willing to entertain passengers through their "Artists on Board" program.

Use in popular culture 
 A documentary on The Canadian is featured on the Discovery Channel’s TV show Mighty Trains in Season One, Episode Three.
 The Canadian is the setting for Murder on the Canadian, a children's mystery novel by Eric Wilson.

References

 Classic Trains, Spring 2005, Kalmbach Publishing, ISSN 1527-0718 pg. 58–69

External links

 The Canadian | Via Rail's official site
 Westbound schedule
 Eastbound schedule

Canadian Pacific Railway passenger trains
Named passenger trains of Canada
Named passenger trains of Ontario
Night trains of Canada
Passenger rail transport in Alberta
Passenger rail transport in British Columbia
Passenger rail transport in Manitoba
Passenger rail transport in Toronto
Passenger rail transport in Greater Sudbury
Passenger rail transport in Quebec
Passenger rail transport in Saskatchewan
Railway services introduced in 1955
Via Rail routes